The Grand Council of Basel-Stadt election was held on 14 September 2008. It was the first election under the new constitution and a therefore smaller Grand Council of only 100 representatives instead of 130. Because of that all existing parties lost ground, particularly the Social Democratic Party. The Swiss People's Party (SVP) and the Green Party both did relatively well. The Green Liberal Party entered the Grand Council with 5 representatives.

Results

|-
! style="background-color:#E9E9E9;text-align:left;" colspan=2 |Party
! style="background-color:#E9E9E9;text-align:left;" width=150px |Ideology
! style="background-color:#E9E9E9;text-align:right;" width=50px |Vote %1
! style="background-color:#E9E9E9;text-align:right;" width=50px |Vote % ±
! style="background-color:#E9E9E9;text-align:right;" width=50px |Seats
! style="background-color:#E9E9E9;text-align:right;" width=50px |Seats ±
|-
| width=5px style="background-color: " |
| style="text-align:left;" | Social Democratic Party
| style="text-align:left;" | Social democracy
| style="text-align:right;" | 29.7
| style="text-align:right;" | −3.1
| style="text-align:right;" | 32
| style="text-align:right;" | −14
|-
| style="background-color: " |
| style="text-align:left;" | Swiss People's Party
| style="text-align:left;" | National conservatism
| style="text-align:right;" | 13.7
| style="text-align:right;" | +1.7
| style="text-align:right;" | 14
| style="text-align:right;" | −1
|-
| style="background-color: " |
| style="text-align:left;" | Green Party
| style="text-align:left;" | Green politics
| style="text-align:right;" | 13.8
| style="text-align:right;" | +2.3
| style="text-align:right;" | 13
| style="text-align:right;" | −3
|-
| style="background-color: " |
| style="text-align:left;" | Free Democratic Party
| style="text-align:left;" | Classical liberalism
| style="text-align:right;" | 9.9
| style="text-align:right;" | −1.8
| style="text-align:right;" | 11
| style="text-align:right;" | −6
|-
| style="background-color: " |
| style="text-align:left;" | Liberal Party
| style="text-align:left;" | Classical liberalism
| style="text-align:right;" | 8.4
| style="text-align:right;" | +0.4
| style="text-align:right;" | 9
| style="text-align:right;" | −3
|-
| style="background-color: " |
| style="text-align:left;" | Christian Democratic People's Party
| style="text-align:left;" | Christian democracy
| style="text-align:right;" | 9.3
| style="text-align:right;" | +1.1
| style="text-align:right;" | 8
| style="text-align:right;" | −3
|-
| style="background-color: " |
| style="text-align:left;" | Green Liberal Party
| style="text-align:left;" | Green liberalism
| style="text-align:right;" | 5.1
| style="text-align:right;" | N/A
| style="text-align:right;" | 5
| style="text-align:right;" | N/A
|-
| style="background-color: " |
| style="text-align:left;" | Evangelical People's Party
| style="text-align:left;" | Christian democracy
| style="text-align:right;" | 4.4
| style="text-align:right;" | −0.1
| style="text-align:right;" | 4
| style="text-align:right;" | −2
|-
| 
| style="text-align:left;" | Democratic Social Party
| style="text-align:left;" | Social democracy
| style="text-align:right;" | 3.1
| style="text-align:right;" | −1.5
| style="text-align:right;" | 3
| style="text-align:right;" | −3
|-
| 
| style="text-align:left;" | Active Bettingen
| style="text-align:left;" | Liberalism
| style="text-align:right;" | N/A
| style="text-align:right;" | N/A
| style="text-align:right;" | 1
| style="text-align:right;" | ±0
|-
| 
| style="text-align:left;" | Swiss Democrats—Federal Democratic Union
| style="text-align:left;" |
| style="text-align:right;" | 2.4
| style="text-align:right;" | −0.8
| style="text-align:right;" | 0
| style="text-align:right;" | ±0
|-
| 
| style="text-align:left;" | Homosexual List
| style="text-align:left;" | 
| style="text-align:right;" | 0.2
| style="text-align:right;" | N/A
| style="text-align:right;" | 0
| style="text-align:right;" | N/A
|- style="background: #E9E9E9"
! style="text-align:left;" colspan=3| Total
| style="text-align:right;" |  100.00
| style="text-align:right;" | –
| 100
| style="text-align:right;" | −30
|-
| colspan=9 style="text-align:left;" | 1 Excludes Bettingen, which was contested only by Active Bettingen.
|-
| colspan=9 style="text-align:left;" | Source: Canton of Basel-Stadt
|}

Grand Council of Basel-Stadt elections
2008 elections in Switzerland